Castillo de Almodóvar del Río (Hisnu-l-mudawar; "the round castle") is a castle of Muslim origin in the town of Almodóvar del Río, Province of Córdoba, Spain. Previously a Roman fort, the current structure is of Moorish origin, in the year 760. During the Middle Ages, it underwent several renovations and reconstructions. Between 1901 and 1936, it was restored by the owner Raphael Desmaissiers, 12th Count of Torravala, under the technical direction of the architect Adolfo Fernández Casanova. The most important towers are the Cuadrada, the Redonda, and the Homenaje. 

Part of the 7th season of the HBO series Game of Thrones was filmed at the castle. It depicted House Tyrell's home Highgarden, and also parts of Casterly Rock, the ancestral home of House Lannister.

Gallery

References

External links 

 
Information in English

Buildings and structures in the Province of Córdoba (Spain)
Castles in Andalusia